Maricela Neftaly Gallegos Gonzalez (born November 5, 1970) is a Mexican former luchadora (or female professional wrestler), known under the ring name Neftaly, sometimes spelled Neftali. Over the years, Neftaly worked for Consejo Mundial de Lucha Libre, Universal Wrestling Association and AAA in Mexico and for Frontier Martial-Arts Wrestling, JDStar, W*ING and Big Japan Pro Wrestling in Japan.

Neftaly formed a trios team, Las Nasty Girls, with La Briosa and La Monstra. Neftaly and La Briosa won the Mexican National Women's Tag Team Championship in 1996 and held it for 653 days. She also held the Mexican National Women's Championship in the early 1990s, losing it to La Sirenita in 1992. She retired in 1998.

She is the sister of professional wrestlers Reyna Gallegos, El Gallego and El Galgo. She was previously married to professional wrestler Rocky Santana (Victor Manuel Vargas), and is currently married to The Winger (Takashi Okano).

Championships and accomplishments
Empresa Mexicana de Lucha Libre
Mexican National Women's Championship (1 time)
Mexican National Women's Tag Team Championship (1 time)  with La Briosa

Luchas de Apuestas record

References

1959 births
Living people
Mexican female professional wrestlers
20th-century professional wrestlers
21st-century professional wrestlers
Mexican National Women's Champions
Mexican National Women's Tag Team Champions